The 2014–15 KBL season was the 19th season of the Korean Basketball League (KBL), the highest level of basketball in South Korea. Ulsan Hyundai Mobis Phoebus won its third title in a row, and sixth overall.

Clubs

Regular season

Playoffs

References

External links
  

Korean Basketball League seasons
2014–15 in South Korean basketball